Gerry is a 2011 biographical film shot in Quebec about rock singer Gerry Boulet (1946-1990) from Saint-Jean-sur-Richelieu, Quebec written by Nathalie Petrowski and directed by Alain DesRochers. The lead role of Boulet was played by Mario Saint-Amand and Jassen Charron played Gerry Boulet in his early days.

Gerry was filmed in Montréal and other places in Québec starting 19 April 2010. The live concert scene where Boulet and his band Offenbach perform in Montreal Forum required the presence of 3000 spectators.

The film was premiered in Boulet's home town Saint-Jean-sur-Richelieu on 30 May 2011 and launched on Quebec movie theatres on 15 June 2011.

Synopsis
Gérald Boulet was in music from an early age. In the end of the 1960s, he founded the rock band Offenbach with his brother Denis. The group saw great success and peaked in the 1970s with the joining of Pierre Harel. After many years, Offenbach disbanded and Boulet started a solo career with great success in Québec. After many years of drug and alcohol abuse, he was diagnosed with colon cancer and died in 1990, at the age of 44.

Cast
Mario Saint-Amand as Gerry Boulet
Jassen Charron as Gerry Boulet at 13 years old
Capucine Delaby as Françoise Faraldo 
Marc-François Blondin as Johnny Gravel
Éric Bruneau as Pierre Harel
Jonas Tomalty as John McGale
Louis-David Morasse as Denis Boulet 
Eugene Brotto as Breen Leboeuf
Mathieu Lepage as Willie Lamothe
Madeleine Péloquin as Denise Boulet
Roberto Mei as Wezo
Stéphane Archambault as Alain Simard
Nathalie Cavezzali as director
Hugo Dubé as Doctor Jolivet

References

External links
 

Canadian biographical drama films
Canadian musical films
Films directed by Alain DesRochers
Films shot in Quebec
Films set in Quebec
French-language Canadian films
2010s Canadian films